"Mihai Eminescu" National College (Colegiul Naţional "Mihai Eminescu") is a high-school in Constanţa, Romania.

History
The school was founded in 1919 under the name "Domniţa Ileana" Girls' Secondary School (Şcoala Secundară de fete in Romanian) as counterpart to the "Mircea cel Bătrân" Boys' High School (Liceul de băieţi). The college was named in the 1970s after the Romanian national poet Mihai Eminescu. Until 1990 it was called "Mihai Eminescu" Natural Science High School (Liceul de Ştiinţe ale Naturii). In 1990, the name was changed to "Mihai Eminescu" Theoretical High School (Liceul Teoretic) and in 2005 was given the National College (Colegiu Naţional) title, thus becoming "Mihai Eminescu" National College (C.N.M.E.), as it is known today.

Description
The High School's personnel is highly trained, some of the most prestigious local teachers being employed here. Many of them authored different scientific studies or teach at the local Ovidius University.

The High School has 23 classrooms and many offices and laboratories including a history cabinet, a geography cabinet, a chemistry laboratory, and a biology laboratory with an annexed greenhouse. The library has over 40,000 books covering all domains and a spacious reading room. There is also a well-equipped gymnasium and two medical rooms. The High School's students have won many sporting and educational events.

The "Mihai Eminescu" National College is known today as one of the most prestigious High Schools in Constanţa.

The school building, built 1906 to 1908, is listed as a historic monument by Romania's Ministry of Culture and Religious Affairs.

Beneath the building's foundation there are under the city's protection several high value historical ruins.

External links
 Official website

References

Educational institutions established in 1919
Schools in Constanța
National Colleges in Romania
1919 establishments in Romania
Historic monuments in Constanța County
School buildings completed in 1908